Inna lillahi wa inna ilayhi raji'un, also known as Istirja, is an Arabic phrase, mentioned in the second surah of the Quran, and meaning "We belong to Allah, and to Him we return." The phrase is commonly recited by Muslims, either in the midst of being tested by life, both as a sign of patience and an acknowledgment that God is the almighty, and he will not test his worshippers more than they can bear. More popularly, it is also used by Muslims upon hearing that someone has passed.

A similar phrase is used in the Tanakh (Genesis 3:19): עָפָ֣ר אַ֔תָּה וְאֶל־עָפָ֖ר תָּשֽׁוּב׃ (Dust you are, and to dust you will return)

References

Acknowledgements of death
Islamic terminology
Islamic eschatology
Islamic prayer
Quranic words and phrases